HotelF1 (stylised hotelF1; formerly Formule 1) is a French economy hotel brand owned by Accor. Created by Accor in 1984 in France under the name Formule 1, it was renamed HotelF1 in 2007 and later revamped as a road trip-themed hotel brand. HotelF1 manages 172 hotels in France (2018).

History

1984: Formule 1 

After the successful launch of the ibis brand positioned a notch below the midscale Novotel, the group Accor reiterated its strategy in 1984 with the creation of Formule 1, an economy hotel brand positioned a notch under ibis and that was opened its first location in 1985. The Formule 1 hotels were low-key lodging with the essential collective commodities and no on-site restaurant.

The construction process of Formule 1 hotels was completely industrialized and standardized, allowing Accor to open one location every week. In the early 1990s, the engineering techniques of Formule 1 inspired the group Accor to launch another economy brand, Etap Hôtel (now ibis budget). In the late 1990s, the construction techniques of Formule 1 were also adopted by Accor's other economy brand, ibis.

In 1997, Formule 1 occupied 39% of the super-economy hotel market in France. From 1985 to 2005, 100 million customers stayed in Formule 1 hotels.

2007: HotelF1 

In 2007, Formule 1 was rebranded as HotelF1. In September 2009, Accor announced the sale of 158 HotelF1 hotels in a €272-million sale and management-back deal.

In 2012, following a new hotel star-rating system in France, HotelF1 became a one-star hotel brand.

In 2017, Accor announced a new branding strategy and refurbishment program for HotelF1. Shared rooms with a per-bed pricing were introduced. The lobby became an open social space, with a wall to share local tips and a terminal screen with +100 arcade games. The brand signature became On the road.

Description 

HotelF1 is an economy hotel brand. It is designed with a road trip theme and owned by Accor. HotelF1 manages 172 hotels in France (2018).

Development

See also 
 Ibis Budget

References

External links 
 Official website

Accor
Hotels established in 1984